Hydrophilic interaction chromatography (or hydrophilic interaction liquid chromatography, HILIC) is a variant of normal phase liquid chromatography  that partly overlaps with other chromatographic applications such as ion chromatography  and reversed phase liquid chromatography. HILIC uses hydrophilic stationary phases with reversed-phase type eluents. The name was suggested by Andrew Alpert in his 1990 paper on the subject.  He described the chromatographic mechanism for it as liquid-liquid partition chromatography where analytes elute in order of increasing polarity, a conclusion supported by a review and re-evaluation of published data.

Surface
Any polar chromatographic surface can be used for HILIC separations.  Even non-polar bonded silicas have been used with extremely high organic solvent composition, when the silica used for the chromatographic media was particularly polar.   With that exception, HILIC phases can be grouped into five categories of neutral polar or ionic surfaces: 
simple unbonded silica silanol or diol bonded phases
amino or anionic bonded phases
amide bonded phases
cationic bonded phases
zwitterionic bonded phases

Mobile phase
A typical mobile phase for HILIC chromatography includes acetonitrile ("MeCN", also designated as "ACN") with a small amount of water. However, any aprotic solvent miscible with water (e.g. THF or dioxane) can be used.  Alcohols can also be used, however, their concentration must be higher to achieve the same degree of retention for an analyte relative to an aprotic solvent - water combination. See also Aqueous Normal Phase Chromatography

It is commonly believed that in HILIC, the mobile phase forms a water-rich layer on the surface of the polar stationary phase vs. the water-deficient mobile phase, creating a liquid/liquid extraction system. The analyte is distributed between these two layers. However, HILIC is more than just simple partitioning and includes hydrogen donor interactions between neutral polar species as well as weak electrostatic mechanisms under the high organic solvent conditions used for retention.  This distinguishes HILIC as a mechanism distinct from ion exchange chromatography. The more polar compounds will have a stronger interaction with the stationary aqueous layer than the less polar compounds. Thus, a separation based on a compound's polarity and degree of solvation takes place.

Additives
Ionic additives, such as ammonium acetate and ammonium formate, are usually used to control the mobile phase pH and ion strength. In HILIC they can also contribute to the polarity of the analyte, resulting in differential changes in retention. For extremely polar analytes (e.g. aminoglycoside antibiotics (gentamicin) or Adenosine triphosphate), higher concentrations of buffer (ca. 100mM) are required to ensure that the analyte will be in a single ionic form.  Otherwise, asymmetric peak shape, chromatographic tailing, and/or poor recovery from the stationary phase will be observed.  For the separation of neutral polar analytes (e.g. carbohydrates), no buffer is necessary.

Use of other salts such as 100-300 mM sodium perchlorate, which are soluble in high-organic solvent mixtures (ca. 70%-90% acetonitrile), can be used to increase the mobile phase polarity to affect elution.  These salts are not volatile, so this technique is less useful with a mass spectrometer as the detector.  Usually a gradient (to increasing amounts of water) is enough to promote elution.

All ions partition into the stationary phase to some degree, so an occasional "wash" with water is required to ensure a reproducible stationary phase.

Applications
The HILIC mode of separation is used extensively for separation of some biomolecules, organic and some inorganic molecules  by differences in polarity. Its utility has increased due to the simplified sample preparation for biological samples, when analyzing for metabolites, since the metabolic process generally results in the addition of polar groups to enhance elimination from the cellular tissue. This separation technique is also particularly suitable for glycosylation analysis and quality assurance of glycoproteins and glycoforms in biologic medical products.   For the detection of polar compounds with the use of electrospray-ionization mass spectrometry as a chromatographic detector, HILIC can offer a ten fold increase in sensitivity over reversed-phase chromatography because the organic solvent is much more volatile.

Choice of pH
With surface chemistries that are weakly ionic, the choice of pH can affect the ionic nature of the column chemistry. Properly adjusted, the pH can be set to reduce the selectivity toward functional groups with the same charge as the column, or enhance it for oppositely charged functional groups. Similarly,  the choice of pH affects the polarity of the solutes. However, for column surface chemistries that are strongly ionic, and thus resistant to pH values in the mid-range of the pH scale (pH 3.5-8.5), these separations will be reflective of the polarity of the analytes alone, and thus might be easier to understand when doing methods development.

ERLIC
In 2008, Alpert coined the term, ERLIC (electrostatic repulsion hydrophilic interaction chromatography), for HILIC separations where an ionic column surface chemistry is used to repel a common ionic polar group on an analyte or within a set of analytes, to facilitate separation by the remaining polar groups. Electrostatic effects have an order of magnitude stronger chemical potential than neutral polar effects. This allows one to minimize the influence of a common, ionic group within a set of analyte molecules; or to reduce the degree of retention from these more polar functional groups, even enabling isocratic separations in lieu of a gradient in some situations. His subsequent publication further described orientation effects which others have also called ion-pair normal phase or e-HILIC, reflecting retention mechanisms sensitive to a particular ionic portion of the analyte, either attractive or repulsive. ERLIC (eHILIC) separations need not be isocratic, but the net effect is the reduction of the attraction of a particularly strong polar group, which then requires less strong elution conditions, and the enhanced interaction of the remaining polar (opposite charged ionic, or non-ionic) functional groups of the analyte(s).

Cationic eHILIC
For example, one could use a cation exchange (negatively charged) surface chemistry for ERLIC separations to reduce the influence on retention of anionic (negatively charged) groups (the phosphates of nucleotides or of phosphonyl antibiotic mixtures; or sialic acid groups of modified carbohydrates) to now allow separation based more on the basic and/or neutral functional groups of these molecules. Modifying the polarity of a weakly ionic group (e.g. carboxyl) on the surface is easily accomplished by adjusting the pH to be within two pH units of that group's pKa. For strongly ionic functional groups of the surface (i.e. sulfates or phosphates) one could instead use a lower amount of buffer so the residual charge is not completely ion paired. An example of this would be the use of a 12.5mM (rather than the recommended >20mM buffer), pH 9.2 mobile phase on a polymeric, zwitterionic, betaine-sulfonate surface to separate phosphonyl antibiotic mixtures (each containing a phosphate group). This enhances the influence of the column's sulfonic acid functional groups of its surface chemistry over its, slightly diminished (by pH), quaternary amine. Commensurate with this, these analytes will show a reduced retention on the column eluting earlier, and in higher amounts of organic solvent, than if a neutral polar HILIC surface were used. This also increases their detection sensitivity by negative ion mass spectrometry.

Anionic eHILIC
By analogy to the above, one can use an anion exchange (positively charged) column surface chemistry to reduce the influence on retention of cationic (positively charged) functional groups for a set of analytes, such as when selectively isolating phosphorylated peptides or sulfated polysaccharide molecules. Use of a pH between 1 and 2 pH units will reduce the polarity of two of the three ionizable oxygens of the phosphate group, and thus will allow easy desorption from the (oppositely charged) surface chemistry. It will also reduce the influence of negatively charged carboxyls in the analytes, since they will be protonated at this low a pH value, and thus contribute less overall polarity to the molecule. Any common, positively charged amino groups will be repelled from the column surface chemistry and thus these conditions enhance the role of the phosphate's polarity (as well as other neutral polar groups) in the separation.

References

Chromatography
Laboratory techniques
Molecular biology
Biochemistry methods